Johnson University is a private Christian university with its main campus in Kimberlin Heights, Tennessee, and a second campus in Kissimmee, Florida. It is affiliated with the Christian churches and churches of Christ, a branch of the Restoration Movement.

History
When Ashley Johnson founded the school in 1893, it was an extension of the Correspondence Bible College.  The original name was The School of the Evangelists.  The school was renamed Johnson Bible College in 1909 after a petition by the students to have the school named after the founder and first president Ashley Johnson. This name was used for 102 years until the college became Johnson University on July 1, 2011.

The idea for a new school was first introduced in a sermon by Ashley S. Johnson at the Bearden Christian Church in 1892 when Johnson proposed the idea of a college level school for the gospels. In May 1893, guests boarded a steamboat in Knoxville to go up to the college for the laying of the cornerstone of the Main Building. The Main Building, with "its five-story square tower that offered a sweeping view of the French Broad, was completed in 1895."  The original Main Building served the school until Dec 1, 1904, when a fire broke out from a chimney and completely destroyed the building. Following the fire, a new building was constructed of brick and the dedication was held in 1905.

Ashley Johnson served the school until his death in 1925.  Upon his death, his wife Emma Elizabeth Johnson served as the college president until her death in 1927.  Alva Ross Brown was chosen as the third president from that year until his 1941 death.  Dr. Robert M Bell was selected as the 4th president and under his leadership the school was greatly expanded in both academic offerings and facilities.  Dr. Bell served until his death in 1968.  David L. Eubanks assumed the presidency in 1969 and served until retiring in 2007, overseeing the continued expansion of academic offerings and the construction of many new buildings.  During Dr. Eubanks administration the school moved off "the hill" that it was founded on into the surrounding fields.  Following his retirement, Gary E. Weedman became the president; during his tenure, the college assumed the style of a university. Dr. L. Thomas Smith Jr. was inaugurated as the seventh president in September 2018.

Presidents
Johnson University is unique in its over 125 year history it has only had seven Presidents.  Each of those Presidents have had other distinctions that set them apart from other institutions. When Emma Elizabeth Johnson became president in 1925, she was one of the first women to be elected and serve as president of any college in the United States. Alva Ross Brown become president in 1927 and at the age of 22 and was one of the youngest college presidents in US higher education history.  Alva Ross Brown was followed in 1941 by professor and trustee Robert M. Bell as the fourth president of the college.  The fifth, Dr. David L. Eubanks was the first President to retire from office but remains one of the longest serving college presidents in the US and later served as the chief operating officer of Johnson University Florida. Across from the Old Main Building is located "Shiloh on the Heights", the final resting place of all the past presidents of the University and a Columbarium.

In 1896, during his tenure as the college's president, Ashley Johnson wrote the Condensed Biblical Encyclopedia.

Academics
Johnson University is accredited to award associate’s, bachelor’s, master’s, and doctoral degrees.  Arranged into 8 different schools, Johnson is able to offer over 70 different programs.

School of Arts & Sciences
School of Bible & Theology
School of Business & Public Leadership
School of Communication & Creative Arts
School of Congregational Ministry
Templar School of Education
School of Intercultural Studies
School of Social & Behavioral Sciences

Accreditation
Johnson University is accredited both regionally and nationally.  Johnson first received regional accreditation in 1979 from the Commission on Colleges of the Southern Association of Colleges and Schools.  Programs in the School of Bible & Theology and the School of Congregational Ministry are both nationally accredited by the Commission on Accreditation of the Association for Biblical Higher Education.  The Council for Accreditation of Counseling and Related Educational Programs has granted accreditation to the School of Social and Behavioral Sciences in the concentrations of Clinical Mental Health Counseling (M.A.) and School Counseling (M.A.).  The Teacher Education Program is approved by the Tennessee State Board of Education.

Campuses
The university has two physical campuses and an online campus. The Tennessee campus is located in the upper Tennessee River valley on the banks of the French Broad River just upstream from where it and the Holston River merge to form the Tennessee. Support for the online campus is also located on the Tennessee Campus.

The Florida Campus, Johnson University Florida, is located at the site of the former Florida Christian College, in Kissimmee, Florida, just 20 miles south of downtown Orlando, Florida.

Tennessee campus facilities
Since its founding, Johnson University has had many different buildings.  While many are still in use, some have been refurbished and repurposed while a few have been demolished.

Academic
 Myrtle Hall – Built 1951 (School of Social & Behavioral Sciences, former women's dormitory)
 Glass Memorial Library – Built 1964, enlarged 1989
 Phillips−Welshimer Building - Built 1975 (Schools of Arts & Sciences, Bible & Theology, Business & Public Leadership, Congregational Ministry, Administrative/Faculty Offices, Auditorium/Gym)
 Eubanks Activity Center – Built 1989 (Office of President, Student Center, Science Labs, School of Communication & Creative Arts)
 Richardson Hall – Built 2001 (Templar School of Education, School of Intercultural Studies, School of Business and Public Leadership)
 Russell Preaching Center – Renovated 2007 (Location of former Dining Hall & kitchen area in Phillips-Welshimer Building)
 Transitional Music & Plant Services Building – Built 2018 (Music Department & Plant Services Complex)

Campus life 
 Bell Hall – Built 1955 (Apartments)
 Johnson Hall – Built 2000 (Women's Dorm)
 Brown Hall – Built 2000 (Men's Dorm)
 Gally Commons – Built 2007 (Dining Hall, Campus Store and Student Post Office)
 River View – Built 2008 (Home of the President of the University, connected to The White House)
 The Graham Center – Athletic & Recreation Complex –  Built 2019

Current historic facilities
 The White House – Built 1890 (Restored home of Dr. and Mrs. Johnson)
 Old Main Building – Built 1905 (Old Chapel & Archeological Museum)

Closed 
 Clark Hall – Built 1905 (Men's Dormitory attached to Old Main)
 Old Gymnasium & Pool –  Built 1949
 Alumni Memorial Chapel –  Built 1961 (Chapel & Music Department)

Historic former facilities
 Original Main Building – 1893–1904 (Wooden building located at the current site of the Old Main Building). 
 Industrial Hall "Old Dusty" – 1898–1960 (Wooden building located near the site of Bell Hall, Alumni Memorial Chapel, and the Old Gymnasium & Pool). The Lower level contained the wood shops with Women's dorm rooms on upper floor.
 Irwin Library – 1912–2000 (Three story brick building located on the hill near the Old Main Building). This was the location of the second college library when it had outgrown the Old Main Building and was also a location of several classrooms.  The library was adorned with Pink Tennessee Marble much of which is located in the sidewalk to Richardson Hall.
 Brown Hall – 1971–2000 (3 story facility, former men's dormitory)
 Johnson Hall – 1972–2000 (3 story facility with rooms arranged in suites, former women's dormitory)
 Dairy Barn – 1800s to 1970s (The college's Dairy Barn was located where the Phillips−Welshimer Building Building is today) This was the home to the prized dairy herd; the Dixie Holstein Herd.

Athletics
The athletic teams of the Johnson–Tennessee (JUTN) campus are called the Royals. The campus is a member of the National Association of Intercollegiate Athletics (NAIA), primarily competing in the Appalachian Athletic Conference (AAC) since the 2021–22 academic year. They are also a member of the National Christian College Athletic Association (NCCAA), primarily competing as an independent in the Mid-East Region of the Division II level.

JUTN competes in ten intercollegiate varsity sports: Men's sports include baseball, basketball, soccer and tennis; while women's sports include basketball, lacrosse, soccer, softball, tennis and volleyball.

Notable alumni
Notable alumni include:
 Grover Cleveland Brewer (1884–1956), minister in the Churches of Christ
 Fred Craddock (1928–2015), minister in the Disciples of Christ and Emory University scholar of homiletics
 Oren E. Long (1889–1965), territorial governor of Hawaii and one of Hawaii's first two United States Senators
 Frank Weston Moore (born April 22,1957), American college basketball coach; current women's basketball head coach at NC State
 Jeffrey O, Nigerian-American executive and writer

Picture gallery

References

External links

 Official website
 Official athletics website

Association for Biblical Higher Education
Universities and colleges accredited by the Southern Association of Colleges and Schools
Private universities and colleges in Tennessee
Universities and colleges affiliated with the Christian churches and churches of Christ
Bible colleges
Educational institutions established in 1893
Universities and colleges in Knoxville, Tennessee
1893 establishments in Tennessee